Blakea attenboroughii is a species of plant in the genus Blakea. It is endemic to Ecuador and is named after the naturalist and television presenter, David Attenborough.

The species was discovered by Lou Jost, an American botanist, in 2007.

See also
 List of things named after David Attenborough and his works

References

attenboroughi
Endemic flora of Ecuador
Plants described in 2007
David Attenborough